Adelpha pollina is a butterfly of the family Nymphalidae. It was described by Hans Fruhstorfer in 1915. It is found from Honduras to Panama, French Guiana and Bolivia.

The wingspan is about 45 mm.

References

 Adelpha pollina at Insecta.pro

Butterflies described in 1915
Adelpha
Nymphalidae of South America
Taxa named by Hans Fruhstorfer